Brigitte Flierl (born 9 October 1956) is a German former speed skater. She competed in two events at the 1980 Winter Olympics.

References

External links
 

1956 births
Living people
German female speed skaters
Olympic speed skaters of West Germany
Speed skaters at the 1980 Winter Olympics
People from Amberg
Sportspeople from the Upper Palatinate